Yamina Halata (born 4 September 1991) is an Algerian judoka. She is a silver medalist at the African Games. She won the gold medal in her event at the 2022 African Judo Championships held in Oran, Algeria.

Career 

In 2019, she won one of the bronze medals in the women's 57 kg event at the African Judo Championships held in Cape Town, South Africa.

At the 2021 African Judo Championships held in Dakar, Senegal, she also won one of the bronze medals in her event.

She lost her bronze medal match in the women's 57 kg event at the 2022 Mediterranean Games held in Oran, Algeria.

Achievements

References

External links 
 

Living people
1991 births
Place of birth missing (living people)
Algerian female judoka
Mediterranean Games competitors for Algeria
Competitors at the 2018 Mediterranean Games
Competitors at the 2022 Mediterranean Games
African Games medalists in judo
African Games silver medalists for Algeria
Competitors at the 2019 African Games
21st-century Algerian women